Natascha Wharton (born 1965) is a British film producer and founder of WT2 Productions, an independent film production company, and subsidiary of Working Title Films.

Biography

Wharton was born in Trinidad to a German mother and Trinidadian father.

Prior to joining Working Title Films, Wharton served as an assistant to producer Eric Fellner, who would later co-own the company. She joined Working Title in 1993, serving as an assistant to Fellner and Working Title co-founder Tim Bevan. Wharton later became a development executive for the company and, in 1999, established Working Title's subsidiary WT2 Productions as a production company that produced independent films.  Films produced under the WT2 production banner include Shaun of the Dead, Billy Elliot, The Calcium Kid and Ali G Indahouse.

Wharton left Working Title in July 2009. She is currently the head of development and production executive for the British Film Institute's Film Fund.

Filmography

References

External links
 

1965 births
Living people
British people of German descent
British people of Trinidad and Tobago descent
British film producers